Eliezer Yehuda Finkel may refer to one of the two rosh yeshivas of the Mir yeshivas:

 Eliezer Yehuda Finkel (born 1879) (1879–1965), also known as Reb Leizer Yudel, rosh yeshiva of the Mir yeshiva in Poland and Jerusalem
 Eliezer Yehuda Finkel (born 1965), current rosh yeshiva of the Mir Yeshiva in Jerusalem